Muhammadabad Gohna is a constituency of the Uttar Pradesh Legislative Assembly covering the city of Muhammadabad-Gohna in the Mau district of Uttar Pradesh, India.

Muhammadabad-Gohna is one of five assembly constituencies in the Ghosi Lok Sabha constituency in Uttar Pradesh, India. Since 2008, this assembly constituency is numbered 355 amongst 403 constituencies. It is not to be confused with Mohammadabad Assembly constituency in Ghazipur district.

Election results

2022

2017
Bharatiya Janta Party candidate Shriram Sonkar  won in last Assembly election of 2017 Uttar Pradesh Legislative Elections defeating Bahujan Samaj Party candidate Rajendra by a margin of 538 votes.

Members of Legislative Assembly

References

External links
 

Assembly constituencies of Uttar Pradesh
Mau district